This is a list of special elections in the Philippines. The Philippines holds two types of special elections: those that were supposed to be held on election day but were delayed, and those held after an office has become vacant. This article describes the second type, which is also known outside the Philippines and the United States as "by-elections". This includes special elections to Congress and its predecessors: the Philippine Legislature, National Assembly of the Philippines, Commonwealth Congress and the Batasang Pambansa, to local legislatures and executive offices, if applicable.

Most special elections are for vacancies in Congress.

Scheduling
In Republic Act (R.A.) No. 180, or the Revised Election Code of 1947, if a vacancy in either chamber of Congress occurs at least 10 months or before a regular election, the president shall call a special election as soon as the chamber where the vacancy occurred of the existence of such vacancy notified him.

In Batas Pambansa Bilang (B.P. Blg.; National Law No.) 881, or the Omnibus Election Code of the Philippines, approved on December 3, 1985, in case of a vacancy in the Batasang Pambansa (National Parliament) 18 months or more before a regular election, the Commission on Elections shall call a special election to be held within sixty days after the vacancy occurs; in case parliament is dissolved, the President shall call an election which shall not be held earlier than forty-five nor later than sixty days from the date of such dissolution. Several weeks earlier, President Ferdinand Marcos ordered the Batasang Pambansa to call a special snap election a year prior to the regularly-schedule election. B.P. Blg 883 called the special presidential election on the same day B.P. Blg 881 was passed. Marcos was then ousted after the People Power Revolution when it was alleged he won that election via massive election fraud. The new government headed by President Corazon Aquino restored the presidential system with a bicameral Congress.

The constitution ratified in 1987 provided Congress to convene on the third day of the vacancy of both the presidency and vice presidency to enact a law calling for a special election for both offices, with the exception that no election will be called if the next scheduled election is 18 months away. If only one of the offices is vacant, the vice president becomes president, or the president appoints a member of Congress as vice president, with both chambers voting separately to confirm the appointment, as the case may be.

Later, as stipulated in R.A. No. 6645 approved on December 28, 1987, once a vacancy occurs in the Senate at least 18 months, or in the House of Representatives at least one year, before the next scheduled election, the Commission on Elections, upon receipt of a resolution from the chamber where the vacancy occurred, shall schedule a special election. The special election will then be held not earlier than 45 days nor later than 90 days from the date of the resolution.

However, R.A. No. 7166 approved on November 26, 1991, amended parts of R.A. No. 6645. When a vacancy in the House of Representatives occurs at least one year before the expiration of the term, the special election shall be held not earlier than 60 days nor later than 90 days after occurrence of the vacancy. For the Senate, if the vacancy occurs also at least one year before the expiration of the term, the special election shall be held on the day of the next succeeding regular election.

With the passage of Republic Act No. 8295 in 1997, if there is only one candidate running for the position, that candidate would be proclaimed as the winner, and an election would no longer be held. This is unlike in regularly scheduled elections where voting would still be held and the candidate has to get one vote in order to be elected. Since the enactment of this law, no special election has seen only one candidate.

Not all vacancies that occurred a year before the next regular election resulted in a special election. To save money, the Speaker appoints a caretaker representative from a nearby district. In same cases a caretaker representative was appointed while an election date was considered.

As with general elections, special elections are usually scheduled on a Monday. During the Third Republic, special elections were held concurrently with midterm elections. However, special elections held since the 15th Congress are mostly done on Saturdays. In some cases, election days are declared as holidays.

Lack of special elections 
In accordance with current laws, the decision to call a special election to fill permanent vacancies is not mandatory, and is solely at the discretion of Congress, which has received criticism for not quickly acting to fill such vacancies. Despite many vacancies occurring well before a year from the end of a congressional term, Congress has left many such seats unfilled. In more extreme examples some even remained vacant for two years or more:

Since the country's independence in 1946, no special elections were called during the presidencies of Carlos P. Garcia, Corazon Aquino and Joseph Estrada; the 4th Congress, during the Garcia presidency, notably did not have deaths in the lower house. During the first half of the presidency of Diosdado Macapagal, and the latter half of the presidencies of Fidel V. Ramos and Gloria Macapagal Arroyo, and from the beginning of the second presidential term of Ferdinand Marcos in 1969 until his removal from office in 1986, no special elections were called. During the presidency of Rodrigo Duterte, no special elections were ever held. In the first half of the presidency of Bongbong Marcos, at least one special election was called.

1986 snap election 

In 1985, the Batasang Pambansa called a special election for the offices of president and vice president on February 7, 1986; unlike special elections elsewhere when it was called due to a vacancy, incumbent president Ferdinand Marcos did not relinquish his office, and that the winners will serve a full six-year term, instead of the remainder of the current term. The vice presidency, which was vacant after it was restored when a constitutional amendment was approved in a 1984 plebiscite, was also at stake. Marcos and his running mate, MP from Manila Arturo Tolentino, won their respective elections against Corazon Aquino and Salvador Laurel, but allegations of massive fraud led to the People Power Revolution a couple of weeks later that led to his ouster.

President (COMELEC)

Vice president (COMELEC) 

In the official results from COMELEC that were later used by the Batasang Pambansa to proclaim the winners, Marcos and Tolentino won over Aquino and Laurel respectively, while in the unofficial results from NAMFREL, Aquino and Laurel led over Marcos and Tolentino.

House of Representatives
Since the 1998 elections, there have been two types of elected representatives, those who represent single-member districts and those elected via the party-list system. When a vacancy occurs for a party-list representative, the next-ranked nominee from the party replaces his predecessor. For district representatives, a special election will be held to determine who shall succeed the predecessor. During the Third Philippine Republic, where representatives had four-year terms, the special election was held together with the mid-term election.

A special election will not be held if the vacancy occurred less than a year before the next regularly scheduled election.

In the tables below, special elections where a change of party occurs have its leftmost cell shaded.

In case of deaths of appointed sectoral representatives from 1987 to 1998, the president may appoint a replacement, with the advise and consent of the Commission on Appointments.

Malolos Congress 
The Malolos Constitution did not provide provisions for holding special elections to fill vacancies in the Malolos Congress.

Philippine Legislature

National Assembly (Commonwealth)

National Assembly (Second Republic) 
The 1943 constitution did not provide provisions for holding special elections to fill vacancies in the National Assembly.

Commonwealth Congress 
No special elections were called for the Commonwealth Congress, elected in 1941 and first met in 1945; the much-delayed elections of 1945 were held in 1946.

Congress of the Philippines

Batasang Pambansa 
While the 1973 constitution had the mechanism for calling special elections in case of vacancies in the Batasang Pambansa, and several vacancies indeed happened, no special elections were called.

Statistics

By reason
The most common reason for the vacancies which were filled by special elections since 1907 is resignation (a total of 28 instances)—both from leaving office to assume another position (21), and for other reasons (7). Death of the incumbent representative is the second most common, accounting for more than two-fifths of instances. Other reasons for holding special elections were to fill new seats created upon the establishment of new provinces (4 instances), and to fill the seats vacated after: a winning candidate was disqualified post-election (2), a representative was expelled from the legislature (1), or a representative was "dropped from the rolls" over a criminal conviction (1).

By legislative era
Most of the special elections—33, or more than half of the 61 conducted as of 2017—were held before the Second World War (1907–1941). In the space of 27 years after the war and before Ferdinand Marcos disbanded Congress and assumed dictatorial powers in 1972, a total of 18 special elections were held. In contrast, since the restoration of Congress in 1987 only 12 special elections have been held in the space of 30 years.

Senate
In the tables below, special elections where a change of party occurs have its leftmost cell shaded.

Philippine Legislature 
From 1917 to 1934, senators are elected via senatorial districts; a vacancy mid-term had been filled up by a special election.

Commonwealth Congress 
 No special elections were called for the Commonwealth Congress.
Starting from 1941, senators elected at-large nationwide, have 6-year terms, with senators elected via staggered elections: every two years, eight out of the 24 senators were elected from 1940 to 1972, and 12 out of 24 senators every three years since 1987. In cases where a senator left office before the expiration of his term, a special election on the day of the next regularly scheduled Senate election was held to fill up the vacancy, as long as the seat per se won't be contested on that election day. There had been three cases where that happened.

Congress

Statistics
Death and leaving office for another position are the most frequent reasons why there are senatorial special elections:

Per election

1951
In 1949, Senator Fernando Lopez (who was on his second year of service in the Senate) was elected Vice President of the Philippines. To fill the vacancy, a special election was held separately with senators whose terms ended in that year:

1955
In 1953, Senator Carlos P. Garcia (who was on his second year of service in the Senate) was elected Vice President of the Philippines. To fill the vacancy, a special election was held separately with senators whose terms ended in that year:

2001
In 2001, Vice President Gloria Macapagal Arroyo succeeded Joseph Estrada after the 2001 EDSA Revolution, leaving the office of the vice president vacant. Arroyo appointed Teofisto Guingona (who was serving the second year of his second term as senator) as vice president later that year but prior to the 2001 Senate election. The Commission on Elections ruled that instead of twelve, the electorate will vote for thirteen senators, with the thirteenth-placed candidate serving Guingona's unexpired term of three years. For purposes of term limits, that senator was deemed to have served a full six-year term.

Former senator Arturo Tolentino and others sued the Commission on Elections (Comelec) to set aside the proclamation of the thirteen senators in 2001. In Tolentino vs. Comelec, the Supreme Court ruled that the commission did not comply with the requirements of R.A. 6645, nor did the commission "give formal notice that it would proclaim as winner the senatorial candidate receiving the 13th highest number of votes in the special election." However, the court ruled that while the commission failed to give notice of the time of the special election, it did not negate the calling of such election, "indispensable to the elections validity." Since R.A. 6645 as amended "charges the voters with knowledge of this statutory notice and Comelec's failure to give the additional notice did not negate the calling of such special election, much less invalidate it", the court dismissed the petition for lack of merit and allowed the result of the election to stand.

The "thirteenth" senator 
There had been four instances in the Fifth Republic where a seat was vacated exactly midway through the senators' term due to election to another office. In all cases, the thirteenth-placed senator in the immediately preceding election was not given the formers seat since the vacancy occurred after the election.
In 1998, Senator Gloria Macapagal Arroyo was elected vice president midway through her term. Arroyo's seat was up for the 2001 election and no special elections were held, nor was the thirteenth-placed candidate during the 1998 Senate election (Roberto Pagdanganan) proclaimed winner. Later that year, Marcelo Fernan died in office, leaving two vacant seats in the Senate (Fernan's seat was also up in 2001).
In 2004, Senator Noli de Castro was elected vice president midway through his term. De Castro's seat was up for the 2007 election and no special election was held, nor was the thirteenth-placed candidate during the 2004 Senate election (Robert Barbers) proclaimed winner.
In 2007, Senator Alfredo Lim was elected mayor of Manila midway through his term. Lim's seat was up for the 2010 election and no special election was held, nor was the thirteenth-placed candidate during the 2007 Senate election (Koko Pimentel) proclaimed winner. On August 15, 2011, Pimentel assumed the seat of Juan Miguel Zubiri after allegations of electoral fraud.
In 2010, Senator Benigno Aquino III was elected president midway through his term. Aquino's seat was up for the 2013 election and no special election was held, nor was the thirteenth-placed candidate during the 2010 Senate election (Risa Hontiveros) proclaimed winner.
In all of those cases, the thirteenth-placed candidate was not given the vacant seat as the voters elected for only twelve senators.

This was not a problem for senators elected from 1946 to 1971, as long as they were elected to a new position prior to the second Senate election of their terms; a senator is expected to see two Senate elections in a six-year term instead of just one post-1987:
 In 1949, two years in to his term, Senator Fernando Lopez was elected vice president. A special election was called in 1951 for a successor to serve out the final two years of the term. Felixberto Verano was elected in the special election. Verano was subsequently defeated in the next regular election in 1953.
 In 1953, two years in to his term, Senator Carlos P. Garcia was elected vice president. A special election was called in 1955 for a successor to serve out the final two years of the term. Roseller T. Lim was elected in the special election. Lim was able to defend his seat in the next regular election in 1957.

For senators elected since 1987, their seats will be vacant until the end of their terms since there will be no intervening Senate elections from the day they gave up their seat up to the expiration of their term, unless it becomes vacant prior to election day, as shown in the four examples above.

Special elections elsewhere

Local legislatures

Legislatures under the Local Government Code 
For permanent vacancies in the Sangguniang Panlalawigan (provincial boards), Sangguniang Panlungsod (city councils) of highly urbanized and independent component cities and Sangguniang Bayan (municipal councils) of component municipalities in Metro Manila (currently just Pateros), the president through the Executive Secretary appoints someone from the same political party where the person who caused the vacancy belonged. If the person who vacated the post did not belong to a political party, the local chief executive (the governor or mayor, as the case may be) appoints upon the recommendation of the sanggunian concerned. For vacancies in the city and municipal councils for component cities and municipalities outside Metro Manila, the same process applies, with the local chief executive appointing the replacement. For the Sangguniang Barangay (barangay councils) and Sangguniang Kabataan (youth councils), it shall be filled by the official next in rank. This means no special elections are held for local legislatures under the Local Government Code.

Bangsamoro Parliament 
In the Bangsamoro Parliament created via the Bangsamoro Organic Law, a special election may be called if the vacating seat is from an unaffiliated member of parliament, and the vacancy happened at least one year before the next general election. If the vacancy is from an affiliated member of parliament, the party shall nominate a new member, and if it is a proportional seat, the party names the replacement.

Chief executives 
The vice president, vice governor and vice mayor shall replace the president, governor and mayor, as the case may be, upon permanent vacancy, and shall serve until the next general election. For permanent vacancy for the barangay chairman, the highest-ranking member of the Sangguniang Barangay (the barangay councilor that received the most votes in the preceding election) shall replace the predecessor. No special election shall be called.

If a permanent vacancy for the president and vice president at the same time occurs, a special election will be called. An extraordinary special election was called in 1986.

Deputy of chief executives 
Once a vacancy for the vice governor or vice mayor occurs, the highest-ranking member of the local legislature (the member that received the most votes in the preceding election) shall replace the predecessor. If that member belongs to a political party, that party will nominate a new member to the legislature. If that member is an independent, the governor or mayor will nominate a new member. No special election shall be called.

Delayed elections 
On the first type of special elections, the Commission on Elections usually sets the vote a day later, or up to several weeks later. The latest date the commission set a delayed special election is a more than year later after the regular election, when it held the elections for provincial government officials of Sulu in October 1996 after being delayed since May 1995.

In 2018, the barangay elections in Marawi originally scheduled in May 2018 was done in September due to the aftermath of the Battle of Marawi.

Footnotes

References

External links
Online roster of Philippine legislators (House of Representatives)
Commission on Elections' special elections webpage
Republic Act No. 180
Batas Pambansa Blg. 881
Batas Pambansa Blg. 883
Republic Act No. 6645
Republic Act No. 7166
Republic Act No. 8295

Philippine Congress
Legislative elections in the Philippines
 
Philippines politics-related lists